4708 Polydoros  is a Jupiter trojan from the Trojan camp, approximately  in diameter. It was discovered on 11 September 1988, by American astronomer Carolyn Shoemaker at the Palomar Observatory in California. The D-type asteroid belongs to the 80 largest Jupiter trojans and has a rotation period of 7.5 hours. It was named after the Trojan prince Polydorus, from Greek mythology.

Orbit and classification 

Polydoros is a Jovian asteroid located in the  Lagrangian point, 60° behind on Jupiter's orbit in the so-called Trojan camp . It is also a non-family asteroid of the Jovian background population.

It orbits the Sun at a distance of 4.9–5.6 AU once every 12 years and 1 month (4,403 days; semi-major axis of 5.26 AU). Its orbit has an eccentricity of 0.06 and an inclination of 7° with respect to the ecliptic. The body's observation arc begins with its official discovery observation at Palomar in September 1988.

Physical characteristics 

In the SDSS-based taxonomy, Polydoros is a dark D-type asteroid. It has also been characterized as a D-type by Pan-STARRS' survey. Its V–I color index of 0.96 is typical for most larger D-type Jupiter trojans (see table below).

Rotation period 

In August 2011, a rotational lightcurve of Polydoros was obtained from photometric observations by Linda French at the Cerro Tololo Inter-American Observatory in Chile. Lightcurve analysis, however, gave an incorrect rotation period of  hours with a brightness variation of 0.25 magnitude.

Several subsequent observations during 2014–2018 by Daniel Coley and Robert D. Stephens at the Center for Solar System Studies achieved a good period determination, with the best-rated one from November 2015, which gave a period of  hours and an amplitude of 0.17 magnitude.

Diameter and albedo 

According to the survey carried out by the NEOWISE mission of NASA's Wide-field Infrared Survey Explorer, Polydoros measures 54.96 kilometers in diameter and its surface has an albedo of 0.064, while the Collaborative Asteroid Lightcurve Link assumes a standard albedo for a carbonaceous asteroid of 0.057, and calculates a diameter of 55.67 kilometers based on an absolute magnitude of 10.0.

Naming 

This minor planet was named by the discoverer from Greek mythology after the Trojan prince Polydorus, the youngest and swiftest of King Priam's many sons. Although forbidden by his father, Polydoros confronted Achilles anyway, and was killed by him beside the River Scamander, near his brother Lycaon . The official naming citation was published by the Minor Planet Center on 28 April 1991.

Notes

References

External links 
 Asteroid Lightcurve Database (LCDB), query form (info )
 Dictionary of Minor Planet Names, Google books
 Discovery Circumstances: Numbered Minor Planets (1)-(5000) – Minor Planet Center
 Asteroid 4708 Polydoros at the Small Bodies Data Ferret
 
 

004708
Discoveries by Carolyn S. Shoemaker
Named minor planets
19880911